Pourasham is a 1983 Indian Malayalam-language film, directed by J. Sasikumar and produced by Prasad and Paulson. The film stars Kaviyoor Ponnamma, Menaka, Sukumaran and Alummoodan. The film's score was composed by A. T. Ummer.

Cast
Kaviyoor Ponnamma as Saraswathi
Menaka as Janu
Sukumaran as Sreeni
Alummoodan as Achuthan
Janardanan as Lorence
K. P. Ummer as Rajasekharan Thampi 
M. G. Soman as Gopi
Mala Aravindan as Tomy
Meena as Chellamma
Nellikode Bhaskaran as Bheeran
C. I. Paul as Kurup
Latha as Usha
Vanchiyoor Radha as Achamma
Kollam G. K. Pillai as Vasu
Thodupuzha Radhakrishnan as Damu

Soundtrack
The music was composed by A. T. Ummer with lyrics by Vellanad Narayanan.

References

External links
 

1983 films
1980s Malayalam-language films